Copacabana is a 1947 American musical comedy film directed by Alfred E. Green starring Carmen Miranda and Groucho Marx.

The film is a showcase for Miranda, who performs several numbers in her usual style, including a high-energy rendition of "Tico-Tico". Groucho, as Lionel, her fiance and agent, also sings a musical number, "Go West, Young Man", wearing his traditional greasepaint brows,  mustache, and baggy suit. This was Groucho's first significant film appearance as a solo act, minus Harpo and Chico.

Anne (Gloria Jean), at the urging of Andy (Andy Russell), sings a song called "Stranger Things Have Happened", admitting her unrequited love for her employer, Steve (Steve Cochran).

Plot
Lionel Q. Devereaux and his alluring girlfriend, Brazilian singer Carmen Navarro, have been engaged for ten years. They are highly unsuccessful nightclub performers, due to Lionel's total lack of talent. They stay at an upscale hotel in New York. One day they get a twenty-four-hour notice to pay their bill, but needless to say they lack the funds to oblige. They hurriedly try to convince the big shot producer Steve Hunt to give Carmen a job at the Club Copacabana, and with the help of the easily convinced, gullible singer Andy Russell, posing as an agent, they achieve their goal to get her an audition.

When the producer asks Lionel and Russell whom else they represent, they invent out of thin air a veiled mysterious beauty from Paris and call her Fifi. They persuade Carmen to play the part of Fifi. The producer hires both ladies for the job, but Fifi is the new big sensation who gets mentioned in the press. Steve is very attracted to the girls, and to protect Carmen from the producer, Lionel tells him that he is engaged to be married to Carmen. Steve then turns to Fifi and asks her out instead. Desperate to solve the troublesome situation, Lionel asks Carmen to play Fifi and go on a date with the producer, veiled as usual. Another complication to add to the plot is that Anne, Steve's secretary, is in love with the producer, and not very keen on him going on a date with Fifi.

Andy tries to fix up Steve and Anne, to save both himself and Carmen from discovery. He gets Anne to sing her feelings towards Steve, in an attempt to make him more attracted to and aware of her. The plan doesn't work, as Steve shows no interest in Anne.

A Hollywood movie producer, Anatole Murphy, takes an interest in Fifi, and makes a generous offer to Steve, to take over Lionel's contract for the sum of $100,000, which he refuses. At the same time an agent named Liggett persuades Lionel to sell Fifi's contract to him for the lesser sum of $5,000. Murphy in turn pays $100,000 to Liggett.

But Liggett becomes suspicious, since he sees how the veiled Fifi get into a taxi, and then Carmen comes out of it. Anne reveals to Carmen that the mysterious Fifi has made it impossible for her to get Steve's attention. To help Anne out, Lionel and Carmen stage a fight between Carmen and Fifi in Carmen's dressing room. The fight ends with Fifi disappearing. Lionel reports back to Steve that Fifi has been found dead in the river, but he also expresses his feeling of joy over "killing" her. The conversation is overheard, and he is blamed and arrested for Fifi's murder. Lionel tries to explain to the police during the investigation that he only made Fifi up.

In the meantime, Steve confesses to Anne that he only expressed an interest in Fifi because of his business, and that he is in love with Anne. Carmen enters the scene, dressed as Fifi, but removes her veil in front of everybody, showing that Carmen and Fifi are one and the same. The film producer Murphy offers to sign a contract with Carmen, to use her as an actor in his productions, and also wants to buy the story for a film. Lionel becomes involved in the following film productions, and gets credit for almost everything, from casting to storyline. The picture opens with a song about the Club Copacabana.

Cast
 Carmen Miranda as Carmen Navarro / Mademoiselle Fifi
 Groucho Marx as Lionel Q. Devereaux
 Steve Cochran as Steve Hunt
 Andy Russell as himself
 Gloria Jean as Anne Stuart
 Abel Green as himself (editor of Variety magazine)
 Louis Sobol as himself, columnist
 Earl Wilson as himself
 Ralph Sanford as Liggett

Kay Marvis, Groucho's then-wife, has a small role as a clerk from whom Groucho tries to mooch a cigar.

Production 
According to a news in The Hollywood Reporter (June 1944), independent producer Jack H. Skirball was originally set to make the picture, with assistance from Proser. At that same time, George Raft was announced as the film's possible lead.

The film had its origins when United Artists suggested to Sam Coslow that the studio could use a musical picture to balance its releasing program. Coslow discussed the matter with George Frank, Carmen Miranda's manager and Monty Proser and Walter Bachelor, managers of the famous New York nightclub, the Copacabana, which was located at 10 East 60th St. They decided to combine Miranda with the Copacabana. This was Carmen Miranda's first film after leaving Twentieth Century-Fox, the studio to which she had been under contract since 1940.

Coslow wrote a story which included a dual role for Miranda. They set up a deal with David Hersh as their financial man and UA approved it.

In August Coslow cast Gloria Jean in her first film since 1945.

In September 1946 it was announced  Groucho Marx would star. This was the first film in which Groucho would appear without his older brothers. It is also the first film in which Groucho appeared in his own mustache, rather than a greasepaint one. Groucho got 10% of the profits.

Coslow, Frank, Proser, Bachelor and Hersh put up pre production money including writer's fees and secretarial expenses. They borrowed 65% of the $1,300,000 budget from a bank at 5% interest. The remaining 35% came from a private finance company.

The film includes cameo appearances by Broadway writers Abel Green (the editor of Variety), Louie Sobol (New York Journal-American), and Earl Wilson (New York Post). At the time of the production, Groucho Marx was married to Kay Gorcey, who had a small role in this film.

The Hollywood Reporter news add Chester Clute, Richard Elliott, Frank Scannell, Pierre Andre and Andrew Tombes to the cast, but their participation in the completed film has not been confirmed. Pierre Andre was signed to perform a specialty dance number with Dee Turnell, according to The Hollywood Reporter.

Filming started 1 November 1946 at the Goldwyn Studios.

In mid-Feb 1947, The Hollywood Reporter reported that producer Sam Coslow was considering reshooting scenes in which Miranda appears in a blonde wig, because of mail from Brazilian fans stating that they prefer her as a brunette. The reshot scenes were to be inserted in South American release prints only, according to the item.

Soundtracks 
We've Come to the Copa — The Copa Girls
Tico-Tico no Fubá — Carmen Miranda
Je Vous Aime — Carmen Miranda
My Heart Was Doing a Bolero — Andy Russell
He Hasn't Got a Thing to Sell — Carmen Miranda and Andy Russell
To Make a Hit with Fifi — Carmen Miranda
Stranger Things Have Happened — Andy Russell
Stranger Things Have Happened — Gloria Jean
Go West, Young Man — Groucho Marx
Je Vous Aime — Andy Russell
Let's Do The Copacabana — Carmen Miranda

Critical reception 
Bosley Crowther in his review for The New York Times said: "Together they [Carmen Miranda and Groucho Marx] scream and grimace through a succession of topsy-turvy scenes, some of them mildly amusing and others relentlessly dull." Variety'''s reviewer recognized that "Miss Miranda handled neatly the semi-dual role, shining in the comedy, as well as the French and Brazilian staccato songs."

Lawsuit
As reported in Los Angeles Times on 14 July 1953, Murray P. Koch sued Coslow and George Frank for $80,000, money he claimed to have advanced Beacon to aid in the making of this film. Along with Walter Batchelor and David Hersh, both of whom were dead by the time the suit was filed, Frank and Coslow held a controlling interest in Beacon, which was deemed insolvent.

The disposition of this lawsuit is not known. According to The Hollywood Reporter, the film was obtained for re-release by Hal R. Makelim's Atlas Pictures Co. in Jan 1954. The film was also re-issued in July 1972.

Availability
The film was released on DVD by Republic Pictures through Artisan Entertainment in 2003. In 2013, Olive Films released a new DVD and Blu-ray of the film.

References

External links
 
 
 
 Copacabana at Turner Classic Movies
 Copacabana'' at NNDB
 
The Marx Brothers Council Podcast discussing "Copacabana"

1947 films
1947 musical comedy films
American musical comedy films
American black-and-white films
1940s English-language films
United Artists films
Films directed by Alfred E. Green
Films scored by Edward Ward (composer)
1940s American films